Charles A. Logue (1889–1938) was an American screenwriter and occasional film director active in the silent and early sound era.

Selected filmography

 The Duchess of Doubt (1917)
 A Wife by Proxy (1917)
 Outwitted (1917)
 The Kingdom of Youth (1918)
 A Scream in the Night (1919)
 What Women Will Do (1921)
 Heroes and Husbands (1922)
 The Woman Who Fooled Herself (1922)
 Gay and Devilish (1922)
 The Tents of Allah (1923)
 Straight Through (1925)
 Prisoners of the Storm (1926)
 Unknown Treasures (1926)
 Forbidden Waters (1926)
 The Love Toy (1926)
 Devil's Dice (1926)
 Her Man o' War (1926)
 Hard Fists (1927)
 Red Clay (1927)
 Back to God's Country (1927)
 Cheating Cheaters (1927)
 The Heart of a Follies Girl (1928)
The Michigan Kid (1928)
 Man, Woman and Wife (1929)
 Whispering Winds (1929)
 Fast Companions (1932)
 Black Beauty (1933)
 Ticket to a Crime (1934)
 Sing Sing Nights (1934)
 Home on the Range (1935)
 Make a Million (1935)
 The Hoosier Schoolmaster (1935)
 Renfrew of the Royal Mounted (1937)
 The Marines Are Here (1938)
 On the Great White Trail (1938)

References

Bibliography
 Munden, Kenneth White. The American Film Institute Catalog of Motion Pictures Produced in the United States, Part 1. University of California Press, 1997.

External links

1889 births
1938 deaths
Silent film screenwriters
American film directors
People from Boston
20th-century American screenwriters